Benzoyl-CoA 2,3-dioxygenase (benzoyl-CoA dioxygenase/reductase, BoxBA, BoxA/BoxB system) is an enzyme with systematic name benzoyl-CoA,NADPH:oxygen oxidoreductase (2,3-hydroxylating). This enzyme catalyses the following chemical reaction

 benzoyl-CoA + NADPH + H+ + O2  2,3-dihydro-2,3-dihydroxybenzoyl-CoA + NADP+

Benzoyl-CoA 2,3-dioxygenase is involved in aerobic benzoate metabolism in Azoarcus evansii.

References

External links 
 

EC 1.14.12